Isona i Conca Dellà is a municipality in the comarca of the Pallars Jussà in Catalonia, Spain. It is situated in the valley of the Conques river in the south-east of the comarca. It was formed in 1970 by the fusion of the following municipalities: Isona, Basturs, Benavent de la Conca, Biscarri, Conques, Covet, Gramenet, Llordà, Masos de Sant Martí, Montodó, Orcau i Figuerola d'Orcau, Sant Romà d'Abella and Siall. The town hall is in Isona. The municipality is served by the C-1412 road between Artesa de Segre and Tremp, and is linked to Coll de Nargó by the L-511. It includes a small exclave to the south.

The church of Santa Maria in Covet and Llordà castle are protected historico-artistic monuments.

Subdivisions 
The municipality of Isona and Conca Dellà is formed of fourteen villages. Populations are given as of 2005:
Basturs (40), three kilometres south-east of Orcau
Benavent de la Conca (26), at the foot of a 200 m hill of conglomerate
Biscarri (53), at the foot of the Moles range at the edge of the Tremp basin
Conques (98)
Covet (5)
Figuerola d'Orcau (181)
Gramenet (1)
Isona (619)
Llordà (10)
Els Masos de Sant Martí
Montadó (3)
Orcau (18)
Sant Romà d'Abella (89)
Siall (6)

Demography 
Populations from before 1970 are the totals of the populations of the former municipalities.

References

 Panareda Clopés, Josep Maria; Rios Calvet, Jaume; Rabella Vives, Josep Maria (1989). Guia de Catalunya, Barcelona: Caixa de Catalunya.  (Spanish).  (Catalan).

External links

Official website 
 Government data pages 

Municipalities in Pallars Jussà
Populated places in Pallars Jussà